Change My Mind is the thirteenth studio album by country singer Billy Ray Cyrus, and his first on own record label Blue Cadillac Music. It was released on October 23, 2012. The album includes a re-recording of "I'm So Miserable", a cut from Cyrus' 1992 debut Some Gave All.

Track listing

Chart performance

References

2012 albums
Billy Ray Cyrus albums